Bangladesh is a developing nation. Despite rapid economic growth, poverty remains a major issue. However, poverty has declined sharply in recent history. Shortly after its independence, approximately 90% of the population lived under the poverty line. However, since economic reforms and trade liberalization of early 1990s, along with accelerated economic growth since early-2000s, Bangladesh have experienced a dramatic progress in reducing poverty. The remarkable progress in poverty alleviation has been recognized by international institutions. According to World Bank, more than 33 million Bangladeshi people have been lifted out of poverty since 2000; as measured by the percentage of people living on the equivalent of US$1.90 or less per day in 2011 purchasing price parity terms.

Since early-2000s, rapid economic growth has fueled a remarkable increase in per-capita income. Bangladesh's per capita has increased almost threefold between 2010 and 2020, from under $700 to $2,068, (the highest GDP per capita in South Asia) moving Bangladesh into the ranks of middle-income economy. At current growth, Bangladesh is projected to enter upper-middle income status by 2041. Based on the current rate of poverty reduction, Bangladesh is projected to eliminate extreme poverty by 2021, the first country in South Asia to do so.

General overview of Bangladesh 
Bangladesh's economic reform started with the implementation of investment friendly economic policies, privatization of public industries, budgetary discipline, and liberalization of trade were among the key elements behind acceleration of Bangladesh's economy. Since then, Bangladesh has been among the fastest growing economies in the world, exceeding 6 percent growth annually between 2004 and 2015. The GDP growth further accelerated exceeding 7 percent mark since then, and is projected to gradually exceed 10 percent growth until 2020

Among Bangladesh's many economic and social achievements, dramatic reduction in poverty in often considered a phenomenon among international organizations such as IMF and The World Bank. Between 1972 and 2018, Bangladesh's population living on less than $1.90/day is estimated to have fallen from 90% to 9%. Between 2008 and 2018, The per capita income in the country increased 149%.

As of 2020, female labor force participation rate stands at 45%, while net female school enrollment rate stands at a staggering 98%. World Economic Forum ranks Bangladesh as the most gender-equal nation in South Asia (ranked 47th, followed by Maldives 106th; India 108th).

Rural and urban poverty 

Strong national poverty reduction, masks differences in welfare trends between rural and urban Bangladesh. The national poverty rate fell in both rural and urban areas, but the speed of reduction was much slower in urban Bangladesh, largely because of slower rates of poverty reduction in Dhaka and increasing poverty in Chittagong. There was no progress in reducing extreme poverty in urban areas: the proportion of the urban population living in extreme poverty was 7.7 percent in 2010 and 7.6 percent in 2016. Given that Bangladesh continued to urbanize during this time, there are now more people living in extreme poverty in urban Bangladesh (3.3 million) than in 2010 (3 million). Since independence the average rate of urbanization in Bangladesh is 5%  (World Bank 2012) & percentage share of urban population has doubled, from 15% in 1974 to 28.4% in 2011.

Rural poverty 

Many people live in remote areas that lack services such as education, health clinics, and adequate roads, particularly road links to markets. An estimated 35 percent of the population in rural areas lives below the poverty line. They suffer from persistent food insecurity, own no land and assets, are often uneducated, and may also suffer serious illnesses or disabilities. Another 29 percent of the rural population is considered moderately poor. Though they may own a small plot of land and some livestock and generally have enough to eat, their diets lack nutritional value. As a result of health problems or natural disasters, they are at risk of sliding deeper into poverty. Women are among the poorest of the rural poor, especially when they are the sole heads of their households. They suffer from discrimination and have few earning opportunities, and their nutritional intake is often inadequate.

Urban poverty 

An estimated 21 percent of the population in urban areas lives below the poverty line. People living in urban areas, like Sylhet, Dhaka, Chittagong, Khulna, and Rajshahi, enjoy a better standard of living, with electricity, gas, and clean water supplies. Even in the major cities, however, "a significant proportion of Bangladeshis live in squalor in dwellings that fall apart during the monsoon season and have no regular electricity. These Bangladeshis have limited access to health care and to clean drinking water."

Causes of rural and urban poverty 
One of the biggest cause of rural poverty is due to the fast-growing population rate. It places huge pressure on the environment, causing problems such as erosion and flooding, which in turn leads to low agricultural productivity.

The causes of urban poverty are due to the limited employment opportunities, degraded environment, bad housing and sanitation. The urban poor hold jobs that are labour demanding, thus affecting their health conditions. Therefore, the urban poor are in a difficult situation to escape poverty.

Environmental problems and poverty
With 80% of the country situated on the flood plains of the Ganges, Brahmaputra, Meghna and those of several other minor rivers, the country is prone to severe flooding.

While some flooding is beneficial to agriculture, high levels of flooding have been found to be a retardant on agricultural growth. On average, 16% of household income per year is lost due to flooding, with roughly 89% of the loss in property and assets. Of these, households engaged in farming and fishing suffer a greater loss relative to income.

A positive relationship exists between flood risk and poverty as measured by household income, with people living under the poverty threshold facing a higher risk of flooding, as measured by their proximity to rivers and flood depth. Property prices also tend to be lower the higher the risk of flooding, making it more likely that someone who lives in a flood-prone area is poor and vice versa, as they might not be able to afford safer accommodation. Also, they tend to depend solely or largely on crop cultivation and fisheries for their livelihood and thus are harder hit by floods relative to their income.

Important to the finances of farmers operating small farms is their self-sufficiency in rice and floods adversely affect this factor, destroying harvests and arable land. Farmers hit are often forced to undertake distressed land selling and in doing so, risk being pushed into or deeper into poverty. In areas hard hit by floods, especially disaster floods such as the 1988 flood, several researchers have found that many of the affected households have resorted to selling off assets such as land and livestock to mitigate losses.

Also, in an area hard-hit by poverty and prone to floods, it was found that many of the poor were unwilling to pay for flood protection. The main reason cited had been lack of financial resources although it was found that many of these people are willing to substitute non-financial means of payment such as labour, harvest or part of their land
 
The above is problematic as it creates a vicious cycle for the poor of Bangladesh. Because the poor may not be able to afford safer housing, they have to live near the river which raises their risk of flooding. This would result in greater damage suffered from the floods, driving the poor into selling assets and pushing them further into poverty. They would be further deprived of sufficient resources needed to prevent extensive damage from flooding, resulting in even more flood damage and poverty. It then becomes even harder to escape this cycle. Even those farmers slightly above the poverty line are but just one bad flood away from the ranks of the poor.

Implications of poverty in Bangladesh 
The Gross national income (GNI) per capita measured in 2008 prices is a staggering low of US$520 while GNI Purchasing Power Parity per capita is US$1440 (2008). This is a dismal figure when compared to other developed economies. Even though the poverty rate in Bangladesh has been decreasing, it is doing so at a slow rate of less than 2% per year. Poverty matters because it affects many factors of growth – education, population growth rates, health of the workforce and public policy. Poverty is most concentrated in the rural areas of Bangladesh, hence creating disparities between the rural and urban areas. However, urban poverty remains a problem too.

In particular, poverty has been linked strongly to education and employment. Research papers published by the Bangladesh Institute of Development Studies (BIDS) have shown that poverty acts as both a cause and effect of a lack of education, which in turn adversely affects employment opportunities. Having an unskilled workforce also greatly decreases the productivity of the workforce which decreases the appeal of Foreign Direct Investments (FDIs) and thus impedes sustainable economic growth. In essence, education is an important contribution to the social and economic development of a country.

Secondly, rising landlessness is also a consequence of poverty in Bangladesh. In the year 2000, among the poorest 20 percent of the population – four out of five owned less than half an acre of land. Not only did many own no acreage at all, but landlessness has been increasing in rural Bangladesh along with the number of small and marginal farms. The 2000 HIES found nearly half (48 percent) of the country's rural population to be effectively landless, owning at most 0.05 acres. Roughly three-fifths of all households in the two poorest quintiles fell into that category.

Lastly, for the chronic poor, issues such as food security and health hamper social mobility. According to a study done by the World Bank on Dhaka, the poor suffers from a lack of proper healthcare in their areas due to the expensive and poor quality health care services. The poverty stricken areas either do not have the available facilities, or can only afford low quality healthcare. This is a problem that is common in both the rural and urban poor. For the urban poor, the problem has worsened as they can only afford to stay in slums where there are problems of overcrowding and unhygienic living conditions. These two factors results in the spread of diseases amongst the poor whom cannot afford better healthcare. Also, one cannot deny that a healthy and well-fed citizen is better suited for increased productivity as part of the workforce. Thus, poverty matters because it consequences the social welfare of citizens. Finance minister AHM Mustafa Kamal on Sunday said Bangladesh will be a hunger and poverty free country within the next decade, reports UNB.

See also
Bangladesh
Economy of Bangladesh
List of companies of Bangladesh
Bangladesh Academy for Rural Development
Electricity sector in Bangladesh
Automotive industry in Bangladesh
Bangladeshi RMG Sector
Natural gas in Bangladesh
Steel industry in Bangladesh
Bangladesh textile industry
Leather industry in Bangladesh
Executive Magistrate of Bangladesh
Index of Bangladesh-related articles
Outline of Bangladesh
Shipbuilding in Bangladesh
Foreign relations of Bangladesh
Tourism in Bangladesh
Dhaka Stock Exchange
Chittagong Stock Exchange
3G (countries)
List of slums in Bangladesh

References